Lynne Reid Banks (born 31 July 1929) is a British author of books for children and adults.

She has written forty-eight books, including the best-selling children's novel The Indian in the Cupboard, which has sold over 15 million copies and has been successfully adapted to film. Her first novel, The L-Shaped Room, published in 1960, was an instant and lasting best seller. It was later made into a movie of the same name and led to two sequels, The Backward Shadow and Two is Lonely. Banks also wrote a biography of the Brontë family, entitled Dark Quartet, and a sequel about Charlotte Brontë, Path to the Silent Country.

Life
Banks was born in London, the only child of James and Muriel Reid Banks. She was evacuated to Saskatoon, Saskatchewan, Canada during World War II, and returned after the war was over. She attended St Teresa's School Effingham in Surrey. Before becoming a writer, Banks was an actress, and also worked as a television journalist in Britain, one of the first women to do so.

In 1962, Banks emigrated to Israel, where she taught for eight years on a kibbutz, Yas'ur. In 1965, she married Chaim Stephenson (1926–2016), a sculptor, with whom she had three sons. She lives in Shepperton, Surrey, UK.

Although the family returned to England in 1971, the influence of her time in Israel can be seen in some of her books (including One More River and its sequel, Broken Bridge, and other books, such as An End to Running and Children at the Gate) which are set partially or mainly on kibbutzim.

In October 2013, Banks won the J. M. Barrie award for outstanding contribution to children's arts.

Works

Children's novels

 The Farthest-Away Mountain, illus. Victor Ambrus (London: Abelard-Schuman, 1976); US ed., 1977; also illus. Dave Henderson
 The Adventures of King Midas, illustrated by George Him (J.M. Dent, 1976), ; illus. Jos. A. Smith (William Morrow & Co, 1992), 
  The Indian in the Cupboard (1980)
  The Return of the Indian (1985)
  The Secret of the Indian (1989)
  The Mystery of the Cupboard (1993)
  The Key to the Indian (1998)
 The Fairy Rebel, illus. William Geldart (1985); US ed., 19
 Harry the Poisonous Centipede, illustrated by Tony Ross
  Harry the Poisonous Centipede: a story to make you squirm (1997) 
  Harry the Poisonous Centipede's Big Adventure (2001) 
  Harry the Poisonous Centipede Goes to Sea (2006)
 I, Houdini: The Autobiography of a Self-Educated Hamster, illus. Terry Riley (J.M. Dent, 1978); US ed., 1988

 Angela and Diabola (1997)
 Alice-By-Accident (2000) 
 Tiger, Tiger (2005) 
 Bad Cat Good Cat, illus. Tony Ross (2011)
 Ella and her bad Yellow T-Shirt, illus. Omri Stephenson (OGS, 2011)
 The Wrong-Coloured Dragon, illus. Joanna Scott (Kindle, 2012) 
 Uprooted: a Canadian war story (HarperCollins, 2014), 
 The Red Red Dragon (Walker Books, 2022)

Short stories
 The Magic Hare, illus. Barry Moser (1993); also illus. Hilda Offen 
 Sarah and After: the matriarchs (The Bodley Head, 1975) ; US title, Sarah and After: five women who founded a nation – Bible stories

Older readers
 One More River (London: Vallentine Mitchell, 1973)  
 My Darling Villain (Bodley Head, 1977); US ed., 1986
 The Writing on the Wall (1982) ?88 
 Melusine: a mystery (1988); US ed., 1989 
 One More River, revised edition (NY: William Morrow, 1992), 
 Broken Bridge; US ed., 1994 (revised?)  – sequel to One More River Maura's Angel (1998) 
 Moses in Egypt: a novel inspired by the Prince of Egypt and the book of Exodus (1998)  
 The Dungeon (2002) 
 Stealing Stacey (2004)

Adult novels
 All in a Row: a comedy in three acts (Deane, 1956), The L-Shaped Room (Chatto & Windus, 1960); US ed., 1961 
 An End to Running (Chatto & Windus, 1962)
 House of Hope (Simon & Schuster, 1962)
 Children at the Gate (Chatto & Windus, 1968) 
 The Backward Shadow (Simon & Schuster, 1970) – sequel to The L-Shaped Room 
 Two is Lonely (Chatto & Windus, 1974) – completes the L-Shaped Room trilogy 
 Dark Quartet: the story of the Brontës (Weidenfeld & Nicolson, 1976); US ed., 1977 – Biographical fiction

 Path to the Silent Country: Charlotte Brontë's years of fame (Weidenfeld & Nicolson, 1977); US ed., 1978
 Defy the Wilderness (Chatto & Windus, 1981)
 The Warning Bell (Hamish Hamilton, 1984); US ed., 1986
 Casualties (1986); US ed., 1987
 Fair Exchange (London: Piatkus, 1998)

Non-fiction
 Letters to My Israeli Sons: the story of Jewish survival (W. H. Allen Ltd, 1979), 
 Torn Country: an oral history of the Israeli war of independence (New York: Franklin Watts, 1982)

Picture booksThe Spice Rack, illus. Omri Stephenson (OGS Designs, 2010)Polly and Jake, illus. Omri Stephenson (OGS, 2010)

References

External links
 
 
 Search Results: "Lynne Reid Banks" at Kirkus Reviews''
 

1929 births
Living people
English children's writers
English women novelists
People educated at St Teresa's School
Kibbutzniks
English expatriates in Israel